Cristiano Testa (born 23 September 1973) is a former professional tennis player from Brazil. He is also known as Testinha.

Biography
Testa, a left-handed player, represented Brazil's Junior Davis Cup team in 1989. 

Turning professional in 1993, Testa competed mostly on tour as a doubles specialist. His best performance came at the 1996 Colombia Open where he made the semi-finals with Diego del Río. He made a total of 11 Challenger doubles finals, for three titles, in Medellín, Eisenach and Santiago. In 2000 he reached his highest doubles ranking of 109 in the world and earned a spot in the main draw of the 2000 Australian Open. He and partner Fernando Meligeni were beaten in the first round by eventual finalists Wayne Black and Andrew Kratzmann.

He now works as a junior tennis coach in Porto Alegre.

Challenger titles

Doubles: (3)

References

External links
 
 

1973 births
Living people
Brazilian male tennis players
21st-century Brazilian people
20th-century Brazilian people